Deleni is a commune in Vaslui County, Western Moldavia, Romania. It is composed of four villages: Bulboaca, Deleni, Moreni and Zizinca.

Notable residents include Viorel P. Barbu (b. 1941), mathematician and member of the Romanian Academy.

References

Communes in Vaslui County
Localities in Western Moldavia